East Bradford Township is a township in Chester County, Pennsylvania, United States. The population was 10,308 at the 2020 census.

History
The Cope's Bridge, Gibson's Covered Bridge, Worth-Jefferis Rural Historic District, Carter-Worth House and Farm, East Bradford Boarding School for Boys, Hance House and Barn, Col. John Hannum House, Paradise Valley Historic District, Strode's Mill, Strode's Mill Historic District, Taylor-Cope Historic District and Taylor House are listed on the National Register of Historic Places.

Geography

Adjacent townships
East Caln Township (north)
West Whiteland Township (northeast)
West Goshen Township (east)
Westtown Township (southeast)
Birmingham Township (south)
Pocopson Township (southwest)
West Bradford Township (west)

West Chester, the county seat, is on the east side, between East Bradford and West Goshen townships.

Demographics

At the 2010 census, the township was 91.5% non-Hispanic White, 3.3% Black or African American, 0.1% Native American, 2.0% Asian, and 1.4% were two or more races. 2.0% of the population were of Hispanic or Latino ancestry.

As of the census of 2000, there were 9,405 people, 3,076 households, and 2,408 families residing in the township.  The population density was 625.6 people per square mile (241.6/km).  There were 3,150 housing units at an average density of 209.5/sq mi (80.9/km).  The racial makeup of the township was 93.45% White, 3.49% African American, 0.17% Native American, 1.87% Asian, 0.05% Pacific Islander, 0.40% from other races, and 0.56% from two or more races. Hispanic or Latino of any race were 1.40% of the population.

There were 3,076 households, out of which 41.1% had children under the age of 18 living with them, 70.7% were married couples living together, 5.3% had a female householder with no husband present, and 21.7% were non-families. 16.6% of all households were made up of individuals, and 3.8% had someone living alone who was 65 years of age or older.  The average household size was 2.84 and the average family size was 3.24.

In the township the population was spread out, with 27.4% under the age of 18, 9.2% from 18 to 24, 28.2% from 25 to 44, 26.0% from 45 to 64, and 9.1% who were 65 years of age or older.  The median age was 37 years. For every 100 females, there were 92.0 males.  For every 100 females age 18 and over, there were 87.7 males.

The median income for a household in the township was $100,732, and the median income for a family was $109,459. Males had a median income of $82,811 versus $38,220 for females. The per capita income for the township was $41,158.  About 0.9% of families and 2.0% of the population were below the poverty line, including 0.7% of those under age 18 and 2.3% of those age 65 or over.

Schools
It is served by the West Chester Area School District. Elementary schools serving sections of East Bradford township include East Bradford, Hillsdale, Mary C. Howse, and Sarah Starkweather. Almost all areas of East Bradford township are zoned to Pierce Middle School and West Chester Henderson High School, while a small portion is zoned to G.A. Stetson Middle School and Rustin High School.

A portion of West Chester University South Campus is in East Bradford Township.

Transportation

Numbered highways serving East Bradford Township include U.S. Route 322, U.S. Route 322 Business, Pennsylvania Route 52, Pennsylvania Route 162 and Pennsylvania Route 842. US 322 follows West Chester Bypass and Downingtown Pike along an east-west alignment through the central portion of the township. US 322 Business begins at the western end of West Chester Bypass and heads southeast along the Downingtown Pike in the eastern portion of the township. PA 52 follows Lenape Road along a northeast-southwest alignment through the southeastern portion of the township. PA 162 follows Strasburg Road along an east-west alignment through the central portion of the township, just south of US 322. Finally, PA 842 follows Bridge Road, Creek Road and West Miner Street along a southwest-northeast alignment through southern and eastern portions of the township.

Notable people
Eli Kirk Price (1797–1884), Pennsylvania State Senator, commissioner of Fairmount Park in Philadelphia, Pennsylvania
Gilbert Cope (1840–1928), genealogist and historian of Chester County, Pennsylvania 
Richard J. Baldwin (1853–1944), Pennsylvania State Senator and Representative

References

External links

East Bradford Township official website

Townships in Chester County, Pennsylvania
Townships in Pennsylvania